Alexandra Park is a  park in Manchester, England, designed by Alexander Gordon Hennell, and opened to the public in 1870. The lodge and gateways are the work of Alfred Darbyshire. The park was developed by Manchester Corporation before the area was incorporated into the city, the site being purchased in 1864 from William Egerton, 1st Baron Egerton. The roads to the East and West sides of the park were named Princess Road and Alexandra Road, also in honour of Princess Alexandra.

Design
Two lodges at the Northern entrances were designed by Alfred Darbyshire as homes for the park superintendent and the deputy park keeper.  Only one, Chorlton Lodge, now survives.  Hennell's design includes a raised walk, and a half mile lime walk wide enough for horse-drawn carriages, which are the only straight lines. All the other paths form circles and two large ovals, one of which encloses the cricket pitch, the other being used for football. A lake was constructed from two former marl pits. There is a sunken bowling green and there were originally extensive greenhouses. Alexandra Park supplied plants for the other parks in the city and plants and flowers for the town hall. A large collection of cacti was bequeathed to the city in 1904 by the widow of Charles Darrah. The curator of the collection Arthur Cubbold accompanied the bequest and a large cactus house, with five rooms of different temperatures, was built at a cost of £2,500.  The cactus collection was moved to Wythenshawe Park around 1980.

Demonstrations
Keir Hardie organised the first known Independent Labour Party May Day rally in the park on 2 May 1892 which attracted about 60,000 people.
The park was the venue for the great Manchester Women's Suffrage Demonstration of 24 October 1908 with a procession from Albert Square, and other suffrage demonstrations. On 11 November 1913, suffragette Kitty Marion planted a bomb that damaged the cactus house.  A speaker's corner operated at the Northwest gate. Local Quakers collected signatures at the park gates in 1916 calling for peace.  James Larkin spoke at a demonstration on 14 September 1913 at a rally in support of the Dublin lock-out. Oswald Mosley attempted to campaign in the park against immigration in 1960. Rock Against Racism organised several events in the park, one on 15 July 1978 featuring Steel Pulse and the Buzzcocks.

Entertainment
The park is the site of the annual Manchester Caribbean Carnival. Part of Manchester's Black History Trail crosses the park. In the 1970s, Children's Christian Crusade gatherings were hosted in the park annually.

The park gave its name to the nearby Alexandra Park station, until the station's name changed to Wilbraham Road, on amalgamation in 1923, in order to avoid ticketing confusion.
There was also a nearby Alexandra Park Aerodrome during WW1 and for a few years afterward. That site is now Hough End Playing Fields.

The park gives its name to a nearby council estate, developed in the 1960s. The previous Alexandra Park estate was the birthplace, in 1858, of Emmeline Pankhurst.

Promenade and house

References

External links

 
 

Parks and commons in Manchester